SP-95 may refer to:

 SP-95 (Brazil), a state highway
 Technoavia SP-95, a Russian aerobatic aircraft
 USS Katydid (SP-95), a U.S. patrol vessel 1917–1919